Marind is a Papuan language spoken in Malind District, Merauke Regency, Indonesia by over ten thousand people. Dialects are Southeast Marind, Gawir, Holifoersch, and Tugeri. Bian Marind (Northwest Marind), also known as Boven-Mbian, is divergent enough to not be mutually intelligible, and has been assigned a separate ISO code.

Marind separates the Trans-Fly–Bulaka River languages, which would otherwise occupy a nearly continuous stretch of southern New Guinea.

References

Further reading

 
 
 
 Kriens, Ronald. 2003. Report on the Kumbe river survey south coast of Irian Jaya, Indonesia. SIL International.

Marind–Yaqai languages
Languages of Western Province (Papua New Guinea)